The Puerta de Tierra Phalanstery (Spanish: Falansterio de Puerta de Tierra), simply known as El Falansterio and originally known as the Puerta de Tierra Tenement Group Project A, is a historic district and Art Deco public housing building complex from 1937 located in the Puerta de Tierra sub-district of San Juan, Puerto Rico. 

The district is located in the eastern section of the Islet of San Juan, close to the Capitol of Puerto Rico, and it is bounded by the Manuel Fernández Juncos Avenue to the south, San Juan Bautista Street to the east, and the del Tren and Matías Ledesma Streets to the north and west, respectively. The construction was a New Deal investment from the Puerto Rico Reconstruction Administration with funding from the Federal Emergency Relief Administration. 

The building complex today serves as a public condominium owned by Condominio del Falansterio, Inc. and has been listed in the United States National Register of Historic Places since April 4, 1984.

Gallery

See also 
 Public housing in Puerto Rico

References 

Historic districts on the National Register of Historic Places in Puerto Rico
Public housing in Puerto Rico
1937 establishments in Puerto Rico
Residential buildings completed in 1937
Residential buildings on the National Register of Historic Places in Puerto Rico
Art Deco architecture in Puerto Rico
Puerto Rico Reconstruction Administration